Stand Up is the second studio album by the guitarist Steve Morse, released in 1985 by Elektra Records.

Track listing

Personnel
Steve Morse – guitar, guitar synthesizer, engineering, production
Van Temple – vocals (track 1)
Albert Lee – vocals (track 3), guitar (track 3)
Eric Johnson – vocals (track 4), guitar (track 4)
Alex Ligertwood – vocals (track 6)
Peter Frampton – guitar (track 6)
Rod Morgenstein – piano, drums, percussion, production
T Lavitz – piano (track 9)
Jerry Peek – bass
Mark O'Connor – violin
Tom Wright – engineering, mixing, mastering
Mark Richardson – engineering
Lewis Padgett – engineering

References

External links
In Review: Steve Morse Band "Stand Up" at Guitar Nine Records

Steve Morse albums
1985 albums
Elektra Records albums